Michael Holman may refer to:

 Michael Holman (filmmaker), artist, writer, musician and filmmaker
 Michael Holman (linguist), British linguist and Slavicist
 Michael Holman (priest), Jesuit priest
 Michael Holman (journalist) (born 1945), journalist and author, specialist in Africa